Jack McKay (born 19 November 1996) is a Scottish professional footballer who plays as a winger for Ashton United.

Club career

Doncaster Rovers
Glasgow-born McKay began his career at Doncaster Rovers with twin brother Paul when he was nine-years-old. In 2014, he played in the Gothia Cup with under-18s side; scoring in wins over Malmö FF's academy and Beşiktaş Academy as Rovers progressed through to the knock-out round. The Scot scored the equalizer in the next game versus IF Elfsborg Academy before being eliminated on penalties. He caught the attention of First-Team Coach Paul Dickov with an impressive goal-scoring record in the youth team, including scoring a hat-trick against recent champions Norwich City in the FA Youth Cup.

McKay made his professional debut in a 1–0 league defeat to South Yorkshire rivals Sheffield United in November 2014, coming on as a substitute in the 87th minute. He made a further three appearances in the same season before joining Ilkeston on loan in October 2015 to gain first team experience. McKay made his debut for the Robins in a league game versus Nantwich Town and started in a further three games against Barwell, Colwyn Bay and Stamford but failed to find the net in any before returning to his parent club.

Leeds United

On 11 January 2016, Jack and his brother Paul both joined Championship side Leeds United for undisclosed fees on two-and-a-half year contracts.

After impressing with the Leeds United Development squad, on 21 April 2016, McKay was named as part of the 'travelling squad' for Leeds first team for their match against Wolverhampton Wanderers however he failed to make a place on the substitutes bench, with Steve Evans saying McKay would have been on the bench had Stuart Dallas failed to recover from injury.

McKay played for Leeds' first team in their 2016–17 pre season friendly against Peterborough United on 23 July 2016.

McKay and his brother Paul ended their contracts by mutual consent on 17 December 2017.

Airdrieonians (loan)
On 1 January 2017, McKay joined Scottish League One side Airdrieonians on loan until the end of the 2016–17 season. On 4 February 2017, McKay scored his first goal for Airdrieonians when he scored against Peterhead.

Cardiff City
On 22 January 2018, McKay joined Cardiff City on a -year deal after an extended trial with the club.

Chesterfield

On 26 June 2019, following a loan spell, McKay made his move to Chesterfield permanent, signing a two-year contract. On 2 January 2021, McKay joined National League North side Blyth Spartans on a one-month loan deal. On 9 February 2021, McKay returned to former loan club Airdrieonians on loan having failed to make a single appearance for Blyth due to Covid and subsequently departed Airdrieonians in May 2021.

After winning promotion via the National League North play-offs at the end of the 2021–22 season with York City, McKay returned to the National League North in June 2022 to join newly promoted Buxton. In January 2023, Mckay joined Northern Premier League club Ashton United.

Personal life
McKay's father Willie McKay and his older brother Mark are both football agents. His twin brother, Paul McKay is also a professional footballer. He studied at Hill House School.

Career statistics

Honours
Individual
Doncaster Rovers Academy Player of the Year: 2013

References

External links

1996 births
Living people
Footballers from Glasgow
Scottish footballers
Association football forwards
Doncaster Rovers F.C. players
Ilkeston F.C. players
Leeds United F.C. players
Airdrieonians F.C. players
Cardiff City F.C. players
Chesterfield F.C. players
Blyth Spartans A.F.C. players
Curzon Ashton F.C. players
York City F.C. players
Buxton F.C. players
Ashton United F.C. players
English Football League players
Northern Premier League players
Scottish Professional Football League players
National League (English football) players
Twin sportspeople
Scottish twins